Beau Walker (born 13 April 1985) is former junior Australian surfer who has represented Australia in national and international championships. He is also known for his various hosting duties on the Nine Network (Channel Nine) programmes such as The Shak,  Mortified, Kitchen Whiz, and Pyramid, often using the moniker of 'Nitro'.

Early life 
Beau Walker has one brother named Mark. He was born in Sydney, however moved to Byron Bay when he was 12. He began surfing off local beaches and started entering competitions before his fourteenth birthday. In high school, Walker balanced studies with commitments on the Pro Juniors circuit, winning numerous titles. He was given his first surfboard when he was only seven and has been surfing ever since. Surfing soon extended to different sports like football and Bicycle motocross(BMX). In February 2005, at the age of seventeen, Walker met board maker Cameron Bond who then designed a surfboard for him called the 'Nitro' model.

Personal life 
In 2012, Walker was arrested at a casino nightclub in Pyrmont, New South Wales. Police confirmed they were investigating the 27-year-old over two tablets found in his possession.

Television 
While competing in a televised surfing competition, Walker was spotted by Nine Network and they decided he would be perfect to play the part of Nitro on the then new show The Shak. Channel Nine then placed him in guest roles on shows such as Mortified and Pyramid. When The Shak was cancelled in early 2010 the nine network promised to find other roles for the cast. It was announced Walker would front a new children's show in 2011, Kitchen Whiz, in the former time-slot of  The Shak at Home.

Television career

Surfing career

References

External links 
 Getaway Fact sheets - My Favourite Place: Beau Walker

Living people
Australian surfers
Australian male television actors
1985 births